Riga Passenger Terminal is a terminal in Riga, Latvia, that services public and private passenger traffic by sea. The terminal is situated at the address 3A Eksporta Street.

Destinations
Tallink --- Riga - Stockholm (Departure from Riga daily at 17:30)

References 

Ports and harbours of Latvia
Buildings and structures in Riga